This is a list of notable hamburger restaurants. A hamburger is a sandwich consisting of one or more cooked patties of ground meat (usually beef) usually placed inside a sliced hamburger bun. Hamburgers are often served with lettuce, bacon, tomato, onion, pickles, cheese, and condiments such as mustard, mayonnaise, ketchup, and relish. This list includes restaurants and fast food restaurants that primarily serve hamburgers and related food items.

Hamburger restaurants

 
 
  - Restaurant chain in Texas
 
 
 
 
 
  - American restaurant chain based in New Mexico
 
 
 
 
 
 
 
 
 
 
 
 
 
 
 
 
 
 
 
 
 
 
 
 
 
 
 
 
 
 
 
 
 
 Killer Burger
 
 
 
 
 
 Prince's Hamburgers

Fast food hamburger restaurants

 
 
 
 
 
 
 
 
 
 
 
 
 
 
 
 
 
 
 
 
  (defunct)

See also

 History of the hamburger
 List of casual dining restaurant chains
 List of fast food restaurant chains
 List of hamburgers
 List of hot dog restaurants
 Lists of restaurants
 Types of restaurant

References

External links
 

 
Hamburger